The 1st Louisiana Cavalry Regiment, also known as Scott's Cavalry Regiment, was a cavalry regiment from Louisiana that served in the Confederate States Army during the American Civil War. Raised in 1861 it served all over the Western Theater until the surrender in 1865.

Companies
Company A - Ed Moore Rangers – (Iberville Parish)
Company B - Baton Rouge Rangers – (East Baton Rouge Parish)
Company C - (West Feliciana Parish)
Company D - Rapides Rangers – (Rapides Parish)
Company E - Jackson Mounted Men – (East Feliciana Parish)
Company F - (Concordia Parish)
Company G - Creole Chargers – (Avoyelles Parish)
Company H - (East Baton Rouge Parish)
Company I - Morgan Rangers – (Pointe Coupee Parish)
Company K - Louisiana Dragoons – (Catahoula Parish)
Regimental Howitzer Company - Robinson's Louisiana Horse Artillery

See also
List of Louisiana Confederate Civil War units

References

Units and formations of the Confederate States Army from Louisiana
1861 establishments in Louisiana
Military units and formations established in 1861